Terry Brown was the fourth  Bishop of Malaita: serving from 1996 to 2008.

References

Anglican bishops of Malaita
20th-century Anglican bishops in Oceania
21st-century Anglican bishops in Oceania